An anterior cruciate ligament injury occurs when the anterior cruciate ligament (ACL) is either stretched, partially torn, or completely torn. The most common injury is a complete tear. Symptoms include pain, an audible cracking sound during injury, instability of the knee, and joint swelling. Swelling generally appears within a couple of hours. In approximately 50% of cases, other structures of the knee such as surrounding ligaments, cartilage, or meniscus are damaged.

The underlying mechanism often involves a rapid change in direction, sudden stop, landing after a jump, or direct contact to the knee. It is more common in athletes, particularly those who participate in alpine skiing, football (soccer), netball, American football, or basketball. Diagnosis is typically made by physical examination and is sometimes supported by magnetic resonance imaging (MRI). Physical examination will often show tenderness around the knee joint, reduced range of motion of the knee, and increased looseness of the joint.

Prevention is by neuromuscular training and core strengthening. Treatment recommendations depend on desired level of activity. In those with low levels of future activity, nonsurgical management including bracing and physiotherapy may be sufficient. In those with high activity levels, surgical repair via arthroscopic anterior cruciate ligament reconstruction is often recommended. This involves replacement with a tendon taken from another area of the body or from a cadaver. Following surgery rehabilitation involves slowly expanding the range of motion of the joint, and strengthening the muscles around the knee. Surgery, if recommended, is generally not performed until the initial inflammation from the injury has resolved.

About 200,000 people are affected per year in the United States. In some sports, females have a higher risk of ACL injury, while in others, both sexes are equally affected. While adults with a complete tear have a higher rate of knee osteoarthritis, treatment strategy does not appear to change this risk. ACL tears can also occur in some animals, such as dogs. The most common knee injury in dogs is ACL or CCL rupture; in fact, till proven otherwise, unexpected hind limb lameness is usually due to a ruptured cruciate.

Signs and symptoms
When an individual has an ACL injury, they are likely to hear a "pop" in their knee followed by pain and swelling. They may also experience instability in the knee once they resume walking and other activities, as the ligament can no longer stabilize the knee joint and keep the tibia from sliding forward.

Reduced range of motion of the knee and tenderness along the joint line are also common signs of an acute ACL injury. The pain and swelling may resolve on its own; however, the knee will remain unstable and returning to sport without treatment may result in further damage to the knee.

Causes 

Causes may include:
 Changing direction rapidly (also known as "cutting")
 Landing from a jump awkwardly
 Coming to a sudden stop when running
 A direct contact or collision to the knee (e.g. during a football tackle or a motor vehicle collision)
These movements cause the tibia to shift away from the femur rapidly, placing strain on the knee joint and potentially leading to rupture of the ACL. About 80% of ACL injuries occur without direct trauma. Risk factors include female anatomy, specific sports, poor conditioning, fatigue, and playing on a turf field.

Female predominance
Female athletes are two to eight times more likely to strain their ACL in sports that involve cutting and jumping as compared to men who play the same particular sports. NCAA data has found relative rates of injury per 1000 athlete exposures as follows:
 Men's basketball 0.07, women's basketball 0.23
 Men's lacrosse 0.12, women's lacrosse 0.17
 Men's football 0.09, women's football 0.28
The highest rate of ACL injury in women occurred in gymnastics, with a rate of injury per 1000 athlete exposures of 0.33.
Of the four sports with the highest ACL injury rates, three were women's – gymnastics, basketball and soccer.

Differences between males and females identified as potential causes are the active muscular protection of the knee joint, differences in leg/pelvis alignment, and relative ligament laxity caused by differences in hormonal activity from estrogen and relaxin. Birth control pills also appear to decrease the risk of ACL injury.

Dominance theories

Some studies have suggested that there are four neuromuscular imbalances that predispose women to higher incidence of ACL injury. Female athletes are more likely to jump and land with their knees relatively straight and collapsing in towards each other, while most of their bodyweight falls on a single foot and their upper body tilts to one side. Several theories have been described to further explain these imbalances. These include the ligament dominance, quadriceps dominance, leg dominance, and trunk dominance theories.

The ligament dominance theory suggests that when females athletes land after a jump, their muscles do not sufficiently absorb the impact of the ground. As a result, the ligaments of the knee must absorb the force, leading to a higher risk of injury. Quadriceps dominance refers to a tendency of female athletes to preferentially use the quadriceps muscles to stabilize the knee joint. Given that the quadriceps muscles work to pull the tibia forward, an overpowering contraction of the quadriceps can place strain on the ACL, increasing risk of injury.

Leg dominance describes the observation that women tend to place more weight on one leg than another. Finally, trunk dominance suggests that males typically exhibit greater control of the trunk in performance situations as evidenced by greater activation of the internal oblique muscle. Female athletes are more likely to land with their upper body tilted to one side and more weight on one leg than the other, therefore placing greater rotational force on their knees.

Hormonal and anatomic differences
Before puberty, there is no observed difference in frequency of ACL tears between the sexes. Changes in sex hormone levels, specifically elevated levels of estrogen and relaxin in females during the menstrual cycle, have been hypothesized as causing predisposition of ACL ruptures. This is because they may increase joint laxity and extensibility of the soft tissues surrounding the knee joint. Ongoing research has observed a greater occurrence of ACL injuries in females during ovulation and fewer injuries during the follicular and luteal phases of the menstrual cycle.

Study results have shown that female collegiate athletes with concentration levels of relaxin that are greater than 6.0 pg/mL are at four times higher risk of an ACL tear than those with lower concentrations.

Additionally, female pelvises widen during puberty through the influence of sex hormones. This wider pelvis requires the femur to angle toward the knees. This angle towards the knee is referred to as the Q angle. The average Q angle for men is 14 degrees and the average for women is 17 degrees. Steps can be taken to reduce this Q angle, such as using orthotics. The relatively wider female hip and widened Q angle may lead to an increased likelihood of ACL tears in women.

ACL, muscular stiffness, and strength
During puberty, sex hormones also affect the remodeled shape of soft tissues throughout the body. The tissue remodeling results in female ACLs that are smaller and will fail (i.e. tear) at lower loading forces, and differences in ligament and muscular stiffness between men and women. Women's knees are less stiff than men's during muscle activation. Force applied to a less stiff knee is more likely to result in ACL tears.

In addition, the quadriceps femoris muscle is an antagonist to the ACL. According to a study done on female athletes at the University of Michigan, 31% of female athletes recruited the quadriceps femoris muscle first as compared to 17% in males. Because of the elevated contraction of the quadriceps femoris muscle during physical activity, an increased strain is placed onto the ACL due to the "tibial translation anteriorly".

Pathophysiology
The knee joint is formed by three bones: the femur (thighbone), the tibia (shinbone), and the patella (kneecap). These bones are held together by ligaments, which are strong bands of tissue that keep the joint stable while an individual is walking, running, jumping, etc. There are two types of ligaments in the knee: the collateral ligaments and the cruciate ligaments.

The collateral ligaments include the medial collateral ligament (along the inside of the knee) and the lateral or fibular collateral ligament (along the outside of the knee). These two ligaments function to limit sideways movement of the knee.

The cruciate ligaments form an "X" inside the knee joint with the anterior cruciate ligament running from the front of the tibia to the back of the femur, and the posterior cruciate ligament running from the back of the tibia to the front of the femur. The anterior cruciate ligament prevents the tibia from sliding out in front of the femur and provides rotational stability.

There are also two C-shaped structures made of cartilage called the medial meniscus and lateral meniscus that sit on top of the tibia in the knee joint and serve as cushion for the bones.

Diagnosis

Manual tests 
Most ACL injuries can be diagnosed by examining the knee and comparing it to the other, non-injured knee. When a doctor suspects ACL injury in a person who reports a popping sound in the knee followed by swelling, pain, and instability of the knee joint, they can perform several tests to evaluate the damage to the knee. These tests include the pivot-shift test, anterior drawer test, and Lachman test. The pivot-shift test involves flexing the knee while holding onto the ankle and slightly rotating the tibia inwards. In the anterior drawer test, the examiner flexes the knees to 90 degrees, sits on the person's feet, and gently pulls the tibia towards themself. The Lachman test is performed by placing one hand on the person's thigh and the other on the tibia and pulling the tibia forward. These tests are meant to test whether the ACL is intact and therefore able to limit the forward motion of the tibia. The Lachman test is recognized by most authorities as the most reliable and sensitive of the three.

Medical imaging 

Though clinical examination in experienced hands can be accurate, the diagnosis is usually confirmed by magnetic resonance imaging, which provides images of the soft tissues like ligaments and cartilage around the knee. It may also permit visualization of other structures which may have been coincidentally involved, such as the menisci or collateral ligaments. An x-ray may be performed in addition to evaluate whether one of the bones in the knee joint was broken during the injury.

MRI is perhaps the most used technique for diagnosing the state of the ACL, but it is not always the most reliable technique as the ACL can be obscured by blood that fills the joint after an injury.

Arthrometers/Laximeters 
Another form of evaluation that may be used in case physical examination and MRI are inconclusive is laximetry testing (i.e. arthrometry and stress imaging), which involve applying a force to the leg and quantifying the resulting displacement of the knee. These medical devices basically replicate manual tests but offer objective assessments. The GNRB arthrometer, for example, is a knee arthrometer that is considered more effective than the Lachman test.

Classification 
An injury to a ligament is called a sprain. The American Academy of Orthopedic Surgeons defines ACL injury in terms of severity and classifies them as Grade 1, 2, or 3 sprains. Grade 1 sprains occur when the ligament is stretched slightly but the stability of the knee joint is not affected. Grade 2 sprains occur when the ligament is stretched to the point that it becomes loose; this is also referred to as a partial tear. Grade 3 sprains occur when the ligament is completely torn into two pieces, and the knee joint is no longer stable. This is the most common type of ACL injury.

Around half of ACL injuries occur in conjunction with injury to other structures in the knee, including the other ligaments, menisci, or cartilage on the surface of the bones. A specific pattern of injury called the "unhappy triad" (also known as the "terrible triad," or "O'Donoghue's triad") involves injury to the ACL, MCL, and medial meniscus, and occurs when a lateral force is applied to the knee while the foot is fixed on the ground.

Prevention
Interest in reducing non-contact ACL injury has been intense. The International Olympic Committee, after a comprehensive review of preventive strategies, has stated that injury prevention programs have a measurable effect on reducing injuries. These programs are especially important in female athletes who bear higher incidence of ACL injury than male athletes, and also in children and adolescents who are at high risk for a second ACL tear.

Researchers have found that female athletes often land with the knees relatively straight and collapsing inwards towards each other, with most of their bodyweight on a single foot and their upper body tilting to one side; these four factors put excessive strain on the ligaments on the knee and thus increase the likelihood of ACL tear. There is evidence that engaging in neuromuscular training (NMT), which focus on hamstring strengthening, balance, and overall stability to reduce risk of injury by enhancing movement patterns during high risk movements. Such programs are beneficial for all athletes, particularly adolescent female athletes.

Injury prevention programs (IPPs), are reliable in reducing the risk factors of ACL inquiries, referring to dominance theories. The ligament dominance theory reduced peak knee abduction moment but should be more focused on prioritizing individualized, task-specific exercises focusing on an athlete's risk profile. It is more beneficial than a generic program. There is an increase in hip and knee flexion angles, such as plyometrics and jump-landing tasks, which reduces the risk of quadriceps dominance. However, there were no changes found for peak vGRF (vertical ground reaction force), which measures for "softer" landings. Unfortunately, there was no conclusive data on how IPPs reduces the risk associated with leg dominance theory.

Treatment

Treatment for ACL tears is important to:
 Reduce abnormal knee movements and improve knee function
 Build trust and confidence to use the knee normally again
 Prevent further injury to the knee and reduce the risk of osteoarthritis
 Optimise long-term quality of life following the injury

Nonsurgical
Nonsurgical treatment for ACL rupture involves progressive, structured rehabilitation that aims to restore muscle strength, dynamic knee control and psychological confidence. A living systematic review with meta-analysis, most recently updated in 2022, showed on the basis of three randomised controlled trials, that primary rehabilitation with optional surgical reconstruction results in similar outcomes as early surgical reconstruction. For some, the ACL may heal without surgery during the rehabilitation process (i.e. the torn pieces re-unite to form a functional ligament).

The purpose of exercise treatment is to restore the normal functioning of the muscular and balance system around the knee. Research has demonstrated that by training the muscles around the knee appropriately through exercise treatment, the body can 'learn' to control the knee again, and despite extra movement inside the knee, the knee can feel strong and able to withstand force.

Typically, this approach involves visiting a physical therapist or sports medicine professional soon after injury to oversee an intensive, structured program of exercises. Other treatments may be used initially such as hands-on therapies in order to reduce pain. The physiotherapist will act as a coach through rehabilitation, usually by setting goals for recovery and giving feedback on progress.

Estimated non-surgical recovery timeframe is 3–6 months and depends on the extent of the original injury, pre-existing fitness and commitment to the rehabilitation and sporting goals. Some may not be satisfied with the outcome of non-surgical management and may opt for surgery later.

Surgery

ACL reconstruction surgery involves replacing the torn ACL with a "graft," which is a tendon taken from another source. Grafts can be taken from the patellar tendon, hamstring tendon, quadriceps tendon from either the person undergoing the procedure ("autograft") or a cadaver ("allograft"). The graft serves as scaffolding upon which new ligament tissue will grow.

The surgery is done with an arthroscope or tiny camera inserted inside the knee, with additional small incisions made around the knee to insert surgical instruments. This method is less invasive and is proven to result in less pain from surgery, less time in the hospital, and quicker recovery times than "open" surgery (in which a long incision is made down the front of the knee and the joint is opened and exposed).

The timing of ACL reconstruction has been controversial, with some studies showing worse outcomes when surgery is done immediately after injury, and others showing no difference in outcomes when surgery is done immediately compared to when surgery is delayed. The American Academy of Orthopedic Surgeons has stated that there is moderate evidence to support the guideline that ACL reconstruction should occur within five months of injury in order to improve a person's function and protect the knee from further injury; however, additional studies need to be done to determine the best time for surgery and to better understand the effect of timing on clinical outcomes.

Young athletes who have early surgical reconstruction are more likely to return to their previous level of athletic ability when compared to those who underwent delayed surgery or nonoperative treatment. They are also less likely to experience instability in their knee if they undergo early surgery.
There are over 100,000 ACL reconstruction surgeries per year in the United States.  Over 95% of ACL reconstructions are performed in the outpatient setting. The most common procedures performed during ACL reconstruction are partial meniscectomy and chondroplasty. Asymmetry in the repaired knee is a possibility and has been found to have a large effect between limbs for peak vertical ground reaction force, peak knee-extension moment, and loading rate during double-limb landings, as well as mean knee-extension moment and knee energy absorption during both double- and single-limb landings. Analysis of joint symmetry along with movement patterns should be a part of return to sports criteria.

Rehabilitation 
The goals of rehabilitation following an ACL injury are to regain knee strength and motion. If an individual with an ACL injury undergoes surgery, the rehabilitation process will first focus on slowly increasing the range of motion of the joint, then on strengthening the surrounding muscles to protect the new ligament and stabilize the knee. Finally, functional training specific to the activities required for certain sports is begun. It may take six or more months before an athlete can return to sport after surgery, as it is vital to regain a sense of balance and control over the knee in order to prevent a second injury.

Prognosis 
The prognosis of ACL injury is generally good, with many people regaining function of the injured leg within months. ACL injury used to be a career-ending injury for competitive athletes; however, in recent years ACL reconstruction surgery followed by physical therapy has allowed many athletes to return to their pre-injury level of performance.

Long term complications of ACL injury include early onset arthritis of the knee and/or re-tearing the ligament. Factors that increase risk of arthritis include severity of the initial injury, injury to other structures in the knee, and level of activity following treatment. Not repairing tears to the ACL can sometimes cause damage to the cartilage inside the knee because with the torn ACL, the tibia and femur bone are more likely to rub against each other. Nevertheless, ACL tears alone increase inflammatory markers in the knee which can have influence on the development of osteoarthritis.

Unfortunately, young female athletes have a significant risk of re-tearing an ACL graft, or tearing the ACL on the other knee after their recovery. This risk has been recorded as being nearly 1 out of every 4 young athletes. Therefore, athletes should be screened for any neuromuscular deficit (i.e. weakness greater in one leg than another, or incorrect landing form) before returning to sport.

Epidemiology 
There are around 200,000 ACL tears each year in the United States. ACL tears newly occur in about 69 per 100,000 per year with rates in males of 82 per 100,000 and females of 59 per 100,000. When breaking down rates based on age and sex, females between the ages of 14-18 had the highest rates of injury with 227.6 per 100,000. Males between the ages of 19-24 had the highest rates of injury with 241 per 100,000.

Sports

Rates of re-rupture among college athletes were highest in male football players with 15 per 10,000, followed by female gymnasts with 8 per 10,000 and female soccer players with 5.2 per 10,000.

High school athletes are at increased risk for ACL tears when compared to non-athletes. Among high school girls in the US, the sport with the highest risk of ACL tear is soccer, followed by basketball and lacrosse. In the US women's basketball and soccer experience the most ACL tears then all other sports. The highest risk sport for high school boys in the US was basketball, followed by lacrosse and soccer. In basketball, women are 5-8 times more likely to experience an ACL tear than men.

Dogs
Cruciate ligament rupture is a common orthopedic disorder in dogs. A study of insurance data showed the majority of the breeds with increased risk of cruciate ligament rupture were large or giant.

References

External links 

Knee injuries
Dislocations, sprains and strains
Sports injuries
Wikipedia medicine articles ready to translate
Wikipedia emergency medicine articles ready to translate